Les Saisons is a private estate in Hong Kong. Located in Sai Wan Ho of the Eastern District, Hong Kong Island, the property was co-developed by Swire Properties, China Motor Bus and Sun Hung Kai Properties. The estate was completed in October 2001. There is a total of 4 residential buildings with 866 car park spaces provided. More than half of the flats enjoy the sea view of Lei Yue Mun Strait.

Adjacent to Les Saisons, a vacant land owned by the government was originally the designated site of Hong Kong Ice Sports Centre. However, the plan was abandoned while the Aldrich Bay Park, a park featuring old fishing village was built instead. Before the construction of the park, it was once a temporary golf course for training purpose. As the fence blocked certain flats' scenery and the light pollution problem was serious, some of the residents protested against it.

Transportation

MTR
Sai Wan Ho station (Island line)

Ferry
Sai Wan Ho Ferry Pier 
Sai Wan Ho to Kwun Tong line
Sai Wan Ho to Sam Ka Tsuen line

References

External links
Les Saisons Official Webpage

Swire Group
Sun Hung Kai Properties
Sai Wan Ho